Nkwatia Kwahu is a town in the Kwahu East district, a district in the Eastern Region of south Ghana. It is also the home of the St.Peter's Boys Secondary School and also Nkwatia Presbyterian Secondary School.

Education
Nkwatia Kwahu is known for the Nkwatia Secondary School and Saint Peters Secondary School. And Nkwatia Presby Secondary school (Nkwasco) The school is a second cycle institution.
It is the largest town in Kwahu East District.

See also
 Kwahu East District

References

External links
 Kwahu East district website

Populated places in the Eastern Region (Ghana)